The Indian river tern or just river tern (Sterna aurantia) is a tern in the family Laridae. It is a resident breeder along inland rivers from Iran east into the Indian Subcontinent and further to Myanmar to Thailand, where it is uncommon. Unlike most Sterna terns, it is almost exclusively found on freshwater, rarely venturing even to tidal creeks.

This species breeds from March to May in colonies in less accessible areas such as sandbanks in rivers. It nests in a ground scrape, often on bare rock or sand, and lays three greenish-grey to buff eggs, which are blotched and streaked with brown.
 

This is a medium-sized tern, 38–43 cm long with dark grey upperparts, white underparts, a forked tail with long flexible streamers, and long pointed wings. The bill is yellow and the legs red. It has a black cap in breeding plumage. In the winter the cap is greyish white, flecked and streaked with black, there is a dark mask through the eye, and the tip of the bill becomes dusky.
 
  
The sexes are similar but juveniles have a brown head, brown-marked grey upperparts, grey breast sides and white underparts. The bill is yellowish with a dark tip

As with other Sterna terns, the river tern feeds by plunge-diving for fish, crustaceans, tadpoles and aquatic insects in rivers, lakes, and tanks. Its numbers are decreasing due to the pollution of their habitat.

References

 Birds of India by Grimmett, Inskipp and Inskipp'Seabirds: An Identification Guide'' by Harrison, Peter

External links

 A documentary on the life of River Terns by Amoghavarsha JS

river tern
Birds of South Asia
Birds of Southeast Asia
Birds of Yunnan
river tern
river tern